Mario Fabiyo Londok (born 14 November 1997) is an Indonesian professional footballer who plays as a goalkeeper for Liga 1 club Persib Bandung.

Club career

Persipura Jayapura
He was signed for Persipura Jayapura to play in Liga 1 in the 2019 season. Londok made his league debut on 22 May 2019 in a match against Persela Lamongan at the Surajaya Stadium, Lamongan.

Career statistics

Club

References

External links 
 Mario Londok at Soccerway
 Mario Londok at Liga Indonesia

1997 births
Living people
Indonesian footballers
Persidago Gorontalo players
Persipura Jayapura players
Liga 1 (Indonesia) players
People from Kotamobagu
Sportspeople from North Sulawesi
Association football goalkeepers
21st-century Indonesian people